An eclipse of the Sun occurs when a portion of the Earth is engulfed in a shadow cast by the Moon.

Eclipse of the Sun may also refer to:

 Eclipse of the Sun (Grosz), a 1926 painting by George Grosz
 Eclipse of the Sun (film), a 1943 Argentine film
 Eclipse of the Sun (novel), a 1997 novel by Phil Whitaker

See also
 Total Eclipse of the Sun, a 1999 EP by Einstürzende Neubauten
 Solar eclipse (disambiguation)
 List of solar eclipses